Claire and Antoinette Cann (born 1963), known professionally as the Cann Twins, are British identical twin sisters and professional pianists who perform together as a piano duo.

Early life and education
Claire and Antoinette Cann were born in England in 1963. They studied at the Watford School of Music with Jean Merlow and Robert Pell, before progressing to the Royal College of Music where they studied with Phyllis Sellick and latterly received the President's Rosebowl.

They won scholarships to Banff School of Fine Arts, Canada.

Career

Performing
Since turning professional in the 1980s they have toured extensively throughout Europe, Canada, USA, New Zealand and the Far East. They perform frequent concerts in the U.K. at venues including the Royal Albert Hall, the International Series at the Royal Festival Hall, Barbican Hall, Fairfield Halls Croydon, Colston Hall, Bristol, St. David's Hall, Cardiff, Theatre Royal Concert Hall, Nottingham and the Glasgow Royal Concert Hall.

They have performed with orchestras including the Royal Philharmonic Orchestra and Concert Orchestra, the London Philharmonic Orchestra, the BBC Concert Orchestra, the Philomusica of London, the Wren Orchestra and the London Mozart Players.

They were invited by Queen Elizabeth The Queen Mother to perform at the Royal Lodge in Windsor Great Park for Her Majesty Queen Elizabeth II.

Broadcasting
They have made radio broadcasts in Canada, Denmark, Germany, Israel and New Zealand, plus both Classic FM and BBC Radio 3 in the UK. Their television appearances include: the UK, Japan, USA and New Zealand.

Recording
The sisters first published CD recording, Fantasy, was described by the Penguin Guide to Compact Discs as "delightful and generous, ...plenty of virtuosity and, ... especially enjoyable transcriptions; both the Sleeping Beauty Suite and the Polovtsian Dances are sparkling examples".

The second recording, Reflections was the Classic FM Critic's Choice. It was described as catching "... the shimmering tone colours of Ravel's Introduction and Allegro to perfection. No less impressive was Fauré's Dolly Suite".

Their third recording, La Danse, was selected in HMV's Top 49 CDs. Gramophone Magazine described it as "a delightful record, ... scintillating in their two-piano and piano-duet format, ... totally winning without any preciosity or self-consciousness."

Teaching
They give masterclasses in both Europe and America where they are Visiting Professors. The schools include the Royal College of Music, London, Royal Northern College of Music, Manchester, Stetson University, Florida, and Loyola University, New Orleans.

Commissions
Premieres and works written for them include:
The world premiere of Timothy Blinko's Gemini Concerto with the English Sinfonia was commissioned by SoundSense.  
The South Bank premiere of the Concerto for Two Pianos and Orchestra by Max Bruch was performed at the Royal Festival Hall. 
The world premiere of Terry Winter Owens' Intimations of Celestial Events for Trumpet (Antoinette) and Piano (Claire) was held in New York.

Discography
The twins have released three albums of piano music:

Fantasy
Track listing
Rimsky-Korsakoff (arr. Rachmaninoff), Flight of the Bumble Bee
Rachmaninoff, 18th Variation from Rhapsody on a Theme of Paganini
Tchaikovsky (arr. Rachmaninoff), Sleeping Beauty Suite
Michael Elliot, Berceuse pour deux 
Ravel, 3 movements from Mother Goose Suite
Borodin (arr. Cann) Polovtsian Dances
Terry Winter Owens, Pianophoria No. 3
Gershwin (arr. Grainger), Fantasy on Porgy and Bess

Reflections
Track listing
Rachmaninoff, Suite No. 2 Op. 17
Ravel, Introduction and Allegro
William Walton, Popular Song from Façade
Gabriel Fauré, Dolly Suite Op. 56
Poulenc, L'embarquement pour Cythère
Schubert, Fantasia in F minor Op. 103

La Danse 
Track listing
Saint-Saëns, Danse Macabre
Debussy, Petite Suite
Tchaikovsky (arr. Cann) Dances from The Nutcracker Suite
Brahms, Variations on the St. Anthony Choral
Edward MacDowell, Hexentanz
Brahms, Waltzes from Op. 39
Liszt, Hungarian Rhapsody No. 2

Awards
They have been awarded : 
Gramophone 'Critic's Choice', 
Classic FM 'Critic's Choice', 
HMV 'Best 49 CDs'
A rosette in 'The Penguin Guide to Recorded Classical Music (formerly The Penguin Guide to Compact Discs).

References

1963 births
Living people
British identical twins
Classical piano duos
English classical pianists
Women classical pianists
20th-century classical pianists
Honorary Members of the Royal Academy of Music
Twin musical duos
English twins
20th-century English women musicians
English women pianists
21st-century classical pianists
21st-century English women musicians
Identical twin females
20th-century women pianists
21st-century women pianists